Granville Edward Harcourt-Vernon (23 November 1816 – 1 February 1861) was a British Conservative Party politician.

Background
Harcourt-Vernon was the eldest son of Granville Harcourt-Vernon, sixth son of the Most Reverend Edward Venables-Vernon-Harcourt, Archbishop of York. His mother was Frances Julia, daughter of Anthony Hardolph Eyre.

Political career
Harcourt-Vernon was a member of the Canterbury Association from 8 November 1851 and immediately joined the management committee.
Harcourt-Vernon was returned to the House of Commons at the 1852 general election as one of the two Members of Parliament (MPs) for Newark, but did not stand again at the 1857 election.

Family
Harcourt-Vernon married Lady Selina Catherine, daughter of Richard Meade, 3rd Earl of Clanwilliam, in 1854. He died in February 1861, aged 44. His wife remarried twice and died in November 1911.

See also
Baron Vernon

References

External links 
 

1816 births
1861 deaths
Conservative Party (UK) MPs for English constituencies
UK MPs 1852–1857
Members of the Canterbury Association